XX World Youth Day was a Catholic youth festival that started on 16 August and continued until 21 August 2005 in Cologne, Germany, commemorating the 20th anniversary of the first World Youth Day held in 1985. It was the first World Youth Day and foreign trip of Pope Benedict XVI, who joined the festival on 18 August. This meeting was decided by the previous pope, John Paul II, during the Toronto World Youth Day of 2002. The theme was "We have come to worship Him" (from Matthew 2:2).

About 400,000 young people from 200 countries attended during the week, and more than 1,000,000 came for the weekend. They were joined by about 600 bishops and cardinals, as well as by 6,600 reporters.

The Pope's Apostolic Journey to Germany

Originally, Pope John Paul II was to attend the World Youth Day in Cologne. As he died four months earlier, it was instead his successor Pope Benedict XVI's first apostolic journey. Most pilgrims to the World Youth Day made their plans to come while John Paul II was still Pope, and had hoped to see him. Before Pope Benedict XVI led the central mass, he met with several politicians and others.

18 August 

 12:00 The Pope arrived at Köln-Bonn Airport
 16:45–18:00 Journey on the Rhine, the Pope spoke in Köln-Poll
 18:15 The Pope visited Cologne Cathedral

19 August 

 10:30 The Pope met with German President Horst Köhler at Villa Hammerschmidt in Bonn
 12:00 The Pope visited Roonstrasse Synagogue in Cologne. The synagogue was destroyed by the Nazis in 1938 and was rebuilt in the 1950s.
 5:00 The Pope met with and prayed vespers with seminarians from over 80 nations at St. Pantaleon.

20 August 

 10.00 The Pope met with Chancellor Gerhard Schröder, president of the Federal Diet Wolfgang Thierse, Chairwoman of the Christian Democratic Union Angela Merkel and the minister-president of North Rhine-Westphalia Jürgen Rüttgers

The Pope issued a plenary indulgence for those attending World Youth Day, with a partial indulgence available to all who pray fervently, with a contrite heart, that Christian youth
 be strengthened in the profession of the Faith;
 be confirmed in love and reverence towards their parents; and
 form a firm resolution to follow "the holy norms of the Gospel and Mother Church" in living out their present or future family life, or whatever vocation they are called to by God.

21 August 

 An estimated 1,000,000 people, after camping outdoors all night, joined Pope Benedict XVI for the concluding Mass in the vast Marienfeld near the village of Kerpen. Participants too far away to see the pope in the vast field watched the services on more than 15 large television screens. The Pope announced at the end of the mass that the next World Youth Day would take place in Sydney, Australia.

Attending groups

Numerous interest groups attended World Youth Day: schools, universities, church groups, and new movements were all well represented by their attendance.

Photographic gallery

See also
Nightfever, night of prayer event
World Youth Day

References

External links

  Current information on World Youth Day
 Documents of the Apostolic Journey of His Holiness Benedict XVI. from the Vatican
 Official Website of the XX World Youth Day 2005
 Better World Links on the World Youth Day 2005 (German)
 World Youth Day News and Background from the Deutsche Welle

2005
Catholic Church in Germany
World Youth Day
Christianity in Cologne
History of Cologne
2005 in Christianity
Pope Benedict XVI
August 2005 events in Europe